Ulf Stenlund was the defending champion, but lost in the first round to Josef Čihák.

Martín Jaite won the title by defeating Karel Novacek 7–6(7–5), 6–7(7–9), 6–4 in the final.

Seeds

Draw

Finals

Top half

Bottom half

References

External links
 Official results archive (ATP)
 Official results archive (ITF)

Campionati Internazionali di Sicilia
1987 Grand Prix (tennis)
Camp